The men's 4 x 100 metre medley relay competition at the 2014 South American Games took place on March 9 at the Estadio Nacional. The last champion was Brazil.

Records
Prior to this competition, the existing world and Pan Pacific records were as follows:

Results
All times are in minutes and seconds.

Heats
Heats weren't performed, as only eight teams had entered.

Final 
The final was held on March 9, at 19:46.

References

Swimming at the 2014 South American Games